Cranbrook is a district of South Ilford in the London Borough of Redbridge. It has been entirely absorbed into the urban sprawl of Ilford, forming the area north of Ilford railway station. The name has its earliest use in 1233 as Cranebroc. Moreover, it is named for a tributary of the River Roding, the Cran Brook.

References

Areas of London
Districts of the London Borough of Redbridge